This is the list of Awards and Nominations by Singer, Actress, and Fashion Designer Jessica Simpson.

During her earlier career, Simpson became known for her relationship and later marriage to Nick Lachey, with whom she appeared on the MTV reality television series Newlyweds: Nick and Jessica between 2003 and 2005. Following the release of her first Christmas album ReJoyce: The Christmas Album (2004), which was certified gold, Simpson made her film debut as Daisy Duke in The Dukes of Hazzard (2005), for which she recorded a cover of "These Boots Are Made for Walkin'" for the film's soundtrack. In 2006, she released her fifth studio album A Public Affair and appeared in the romantic comedy film Employee of the Month. With the release of her sixth studio album Do You Know (2008), Simpson moved into the country music genre. Simpson has been nominated for three American Music Awards, two MTV Video Music Awards, and a CMT Music Award.

Simpson made her film debut as Daisy Duke in the film adaption of The Dukes of Hazzard (2005). While the film was met with generally negative reviews from film critics, it went on to gross over $111 million worldwide. Simpson recorded the song "These Boots Are Made For Walkin'" (2005) to promote the film; it both samples and shares the title of a Nancy Sinatra song. The song entered the top twenty of the Billboard Hot 100, becoming one Simpson's most successful singles to date.

Aside from her musical pursuits, Simpson launched The Jessica Simpson Collection in 2005, a fashion line of clothing and other items. The brand has gone on to earn over $1 billion in revenue and is regarded as one of the most successful celebrity-founded brands in history. She also starred on the reality television series The Price of Beauty in 2010, was a judge on two seasons of Fashion Star between 2012 and 2013, and published a memoir in 2020, Open Book, which reached number one on The New York Times Best Seller list.

Awards and nominations

Notes

References

External links

 
 

Lists of awards received by American musician
Awards